The Muslim Women (Protection of Rights on Divorce) Act was an act passed by the Parliament of India in 1986 to protect the rights of Muslim women who have been divorced from their husband and to provide for matters connected therewith or incidental thereto. The Act was passed by the Rajiv Gandhi government, with its absolute majority, to nullify the decision in the Shah Bano case, and diluted the secular judgement of the Supreme Court.

It is administered by any magistrate of the first class exercising jurisdiction under the Code of Criminal Procedure, 1973. As per the Act, a divorced Muslim woman is entitled to reasonable and fair provision and maintenance from her former husband, and this should be paid within the period of iddat.

According to the Statement of Objects and Reasons of this Act, when a Muslim divorced woman is unable to support herself after the iddat period that she must observe after the death of her spouse or after a divorce, during which she may not marry another man, the magistrate is empowered to make an order for the payment of maintenance by her relatives who would be entitled to inherit her property on her death according to Muslim Law. But when a divorced woman has no such relatives, and does not have the means to pay the maintenance, the magistrate would order the State Waqf Board to pay the maintenance. The liability of husband to pay the maintenance was thus restricted to the period of the iddah only.

Personal laws
High Courts have interpreted "just and fair provision" that a woman is entitled to during her iddat period very broadly to include amounts worth lakhs (hundreds of thousands) of rupees. More recently, the Supreme Court in Danial Latifi v. Union of India read the Act with Articles 14 and 15 of the Constitution of India, which prevent discrimination on the basis of sex, and held that the intention of the framers could not have been to deprive Muslim women of their rights. Further, the Supreme Court construed the statutory provision in such a manner that it does not fall foul of Articles 14 and 15.

The provision in question is Section 3(1)(a) of the Muslim Women (Protection of Rights on Divorce) Act, 1986 which states that "a reasonable and fair provision and maintenance to be made and paid to her within the iddah period by her former husband". The Court held this provision means that reasonable and fair provision and maintenance is not limited for the iddah period (as evidenced by the use of word "within" and not "for"). It extends for the entire life of the divorced wife until she remarries. In Shabana Bano v Imran Khan, the Supreme Court held that a Muslim divorced woman who has no means to maintain herself is entitled to get maintenance from her former husband even after the period of iddah and she can claim the same under S.125 CrPC.

Divorced women are entitled to maintenance from their former husband not only for the iddat period but also to reasonable and fair provisions for future maintenance. S.3 of the Muslim Women (Protection of Rights on Divorce) Act has to be given under the liberal interpretation to help divorced women. K. Zunaideen v. Ameena Begum (1998) 1 ctc 566.

Notes

The Act is declaratory & retrospective in its operation. Even if the wife is divorced prior to the commencement of the Act, her former husband is liable to provide reasonable and fair provision and maintenance to her. Hyder Khan v. Mehrunnisa(1993)1 APLJ 82 DNC (KER)

References

Sources

Further reading 

Acts of the Parliament of India 1986
Islam in India
Women's rights in India
Women's rights legislation
Rajiv Gandhi administration
Muslim politics in India
Law about religion in India
1986 in women's history
Divorce law
Divorce in India